Zeta Chamaeleontis, Latinized from ζ Chamaeleontis, is a star located in the constellation Chamaeleon. Located around 570 light-years distant, it shines with a luminosity approximately 522 times that of the Sun and has a surface temperature of 15,655 K. South African Astronomer A.W.J. Cousins noted it to vary between magnitudes 5.06 and 5.17 in 1960. It was classified as a Beta Cephei variable in the  Hipparcos and Tycho Catalogues (ESA 1997), with a period of 1.07 days, before being reclassified as a slowly pulsating B star in the 2011 version. It is also an eclipsing binary star, with a period of 2.7 days.

References 

Chamaeleon (constellation)
Chamaeleontis, Zeta
Chamaeleontis, Zeta
Slowly pulsating B stars
Durchmusterung objects
3860
083979
046928